The 1811 New Hampshire gubernatorial election was held on March 12, 1811.

Incumbent Democratic-Republican Governor John Langdon defeated Federalist nominee Jeremiah Smith in a re-match of the previous year's election.

General election

Candidates
John Langdon, Democratic-Republican, former Governor
Jeremiah Smith, Federalist, incumbent Governor

Results

Notes

References

1811
New Hampshire
Gubernatorial